Anna Leonore König, née Falck (29 October 1771 – 20 March 1854), was a Swedish singer and musician (keyboard). She was solo singer in the "Musikaliska inrättningen" (The Musical Institution) in Norrköping in 1797–1801. She was married to Georg Henric König.

König was elected as a member (chair 153) by the Royal Swedish Academy of Music 31 December 1794.

See also 
 Christina Fredenheim
 Margareta Alströmer

References 
 Nyström, Pia; Kyhlberg-Boström Anna, Elmquist Anne-Marie: Kungl. Musikaliska akademien: matrikel 1771-1995, Kungliga Musikaliska Akademien, Stockholm 1996, Kungl. Musikaliska akademiens skriftserie, 84. ISSN 0347-5158. . Libris 7749167.

1771 births
Members of the Royal Swedish Academy of Music
1854 deaths
Swedish women singers
18th-century Swedish musicians
18th-century Swedish singers
Gustavian era people
18th-century Swedish women musicians
19th-century Swedish women musicians